Protocollyris festiva is a species of tiger beetle in the family Cicindelidae.

References 

Beetles described in 2008